Erin Moriarty may refer to:

Erin Moriarty (journalist) (born 1952), American journalist and television reporter
Erin Moriarty (actress) (born 1994), American actress